Chris Haseman (born 2 June 1969 in Brisbane, Queensland) is an Australian mixed martial artist. Haseman is currently signed with Fighting Network RINGS and is a longtime veteran of the promotion (1995–2012). Regarded as a pioneer of MMA in Australia he competed in Australia's first MMA show along with events such as the UFC and the World Fighting Alliance.

Biography

Fighting Network RINGS

Coming from a background in Karate, Boxing, Wrestling and  Jujutsu, Haseman was signed up by RINGS as the head of their Australian branch. He had his debut in mixed martial arts outside the promotion, however, fighting Vale Tudo exponent Murilo Bustamante in Martial Arts Reality Superfighting. Although he lost by strikes in little more than a minute, his next bouts were more successful; taking part in Australia's Caged Combat 1 tournament, Haseman submitted two consecutive opponents by taking them down and ramming his chin into their eye sockets, and it took another vale tudo veteran, Mario Sperry, to knock him out.

After returning to RINGS, Haseman fought professional wrestler Alexander Otsuka and won by doctor stoppage after controlling the bout. He then participated in a February 1998 RINGS Holland event, where he fought Kickboxing and Sambo expert Valentijn Overeem to a decision that eventually went to the latter.

He also competed in ADCC Submission Wrestling World Championship, winning the bronze medal at the 1999 edition at +99 kg.

Haseman eventually was chosen to participate in RINGS's first world mixed martial arts tournament, King of Kings 1999. His opponent would be the renowned Japanese fighter Tsuyoshi Kohsaka, who came from fighting multiple bouts in Ultimate Fighting Championship. Haseman controlled the first round, executing repeated armlock attempts on a defensive Kohsaka, but the Australian was unable to finish him, and this carried to the second one, where Kohsaka took over the grappling exchanges. Entering the third round already tired, Haseman turtled down and continued fighting from the position, only for the Japanese to counter him and grind him with strikes. The match ended with Haseman defending a Guillotine Choke attempt, and it saw the judges eventually awarding the split decision to Kohsaka. Although eliminated from the tournament, Haseman won a bonus fight, submitting American wrestler Brad Kohler by armbar from the bottom in 1:11.

The rest of 2000 was an active year for Haseman as well, submitting most of his opponents and fighting to a decision with future UFC Welterweight Champion Matt Hughes. In September, he was defeated by fellow UFC champion Jeremy Horn in the first time Haseman fell on a submission move.

He returned at the next edition of King of Kings, being pitted first against Carlson Gracie trainee Carlos Barreto, who outweighed him by 30 pounds. The bout was primarily fought on the feet, with Barreto enjoying the reach advantage and cutting Haseman on his forehead with a punch, though also with Haseman returning the favour with a right hook that downed the Brazilian. At the end, Haseman won by unanimous decision after controlling the last round. Haseman next faced professional wrestler Yoshihisa Yamamoto, but the match turned into an upset when the latter, who had been consistently dominated except by an armbar attempt, hit several glancing leg kicks that damaged Haseman's leg. Chris lost by KO and was eliminated.

Haseman later competed at the RINGS 2001 Middleweight Championship Tournament, where he choked out famous ADCC competitor Alexandre "Cacareco" Ferreira before falling to Gustavo Machado. His last bout in RINGS would be against Fedor Emelianenko.

Late career
Chris later competed against Evan Tanner and retired after losing to Canadian Bill Mahood in Spartan Reality Fight series 9 in 2004. Four years later in 2008, he returned to the sport and earned an 18-second knockout win over Japanese Yuji Hisamatsu.

Haseman was scheduled to return to the octagon in 2010 for a rematch against Elvis Sinosic at UFC 110, the first UFC event to be held in Australia. However, just a day before the fight, Sinosic was forced to withdraw with a shoulder injury.

Championships and accomplishments
Fighting Network RINGS
1997 Light Heavyweight Championship Tournament Runner Up
2000 Rising Stars Middleweight Tournament Runner Up
2001 Middleweight Championship Tournament Semifinalist
2001 Absolute Class Tournament Runner Up
Ultimate Caged Combat
1997 Caged Combat 1 Tournament Runner Up
ADCC Submission Wrestling World Championships
ADCC 1999 +99kg third place

Mixed martial arts record

|-
| Loss
| align=center| 20–17
| Gennadiy Kovalev
| TKO (punches)
| Rings – Reincarnation
| 
| align=center| 2
| align=center| 0:28
| Tokyo, Japan
| 
|-
| Win
| align=center| 20–16
| Yuji Hisamatsu
| KO (spinning back kick)
| FWC 1: Return of the Hammer
| 
| align=center| 1
| align=center| 0:18
| Australia
| 
|-
| Loss
| align=center| 19–16
| Bill Mahood
| TKO (corner stoppage)
| Spartan Reality Fight 9
| 
| align=center| 3
| align=center| 1:16
| Australia
| 
|-
| Loss
| align=center| 19–15
| Akihiro Gono
| Decision (majority)
| ZST 2 – The Battle Field 2
| 
| align=center| 3
| align=center| 5:00
| Tokyo, Japan
| 
|-
| Loss
| align=center| 19–14
| Mike van Arsdale
| TKO (strikes)
| WFA 3: Level 3
| 
| align=center| 2
| align=center| 3:10
| Nevada, United States
| 
|-
| Loss
| align=center| 19–13
| Evan Tanner
| Decision (unanimous)
| UFC 38
| 
| align=center| 3
| align=center| 5:00
| England
| 
|-
| Win
| align=center| 19–12
| Yukiyasu Ozawa
| Submission (kimura)
| Premium Challenge
| 
| align=center| 1
| align=center| 6:24
| Tokyo, Japan
| 
|-
| Loss
| align=center| 18–12
| Fedor Emelianenko
| TKO (strikes)
| Rings: World Title Series Grand Final
| 
| align=center| 1
| align=center| 2:50
| Yokohama, Japan
| RINGS 2001 Absolute Class Tournament Finals
|-
| Win
| align=center| 18–11
| Egidijus Valavicius
| Submission (armbar)
| Rings: World Title Series 5
| 
| align=center| 1
| align=center| 3:08
| Yokohama, Japan
| RINGS 2001 Absolute Class Tournament Semifinals
|-
| Win
| align=center| 17–11
| Koba Tkeshelashvili
| Decision (unanimous)
| Rings: World Title Series 4
| 
| align=center| 3
| align=center| 5:00
| Tokyo, Japan
| RINGS 2001 Absolute Class Tournament First Round
|-
| Loss
| align=center| 16–11
| Gustavo Machado
| Decision (unanimous)
| Rings: 10th Anniversary
| 
| align=center| 3
| align=center| 5:00
| Tokyo, Japan
| RINGS 2001 Middleweight Championship Tournament Semifinals
|-
| Win
| align=center| 16–10
| Alexandre Ferreira
| Submission (guillotine choke)
| Rings: World Title Series 2
| 
| align=center| 1
| align=center| 3:03
| Yokohama, Japan
| RINGS 2001 Middleweight Championship Tournament First Round
|-
| Loss
| align=center| 15–10
| Yoshihisa Yamamoto
| TKO (strikes)
| Rings: King of Kings 2000 Block B
| 
| align=center| 1
| align=center| 3:51
| Osaka, Japan
| 
|-
| Win
| align=center| 15–9
| Carlos Barreto
| Decision (unanimous)
| Rings: King of Kings 2000 Block B
| 
| align=center| 2
| align=center| 5:00
| Osaka, Japan
| 
|-
| Win
| align=center| 14–9
| Joe Slick
| Decision
| Rings Australia: Free Fight Battle
| 
| align=center| 1
| align=center| 10:00
| Australia
| 
|-
| Loss
| align=center| 13–9
| Jeremy Horn
| Submission (armbar)
| Rings USA: Rising Stars Final
| 
| align=center| 1
| align=center| 2:36
| Illinois, United States
| RINGS 2000 Rising Stars Middleweight Tournament Finals
|-
| Win
| align=center| 13–8
| Yasuhito Namekawa
| Submission (kimura)
| Rings USA: Rising Stars Final
| 
| align=center| 1
| align=center| 1:30
| Illinois, United States
| RINGS 2000 Rising Stars Middleweight Tournament Semifinals
|-
| Loss
| align=center| 12–8
| Matt Hughes
| Decision (unanimous)
| Rings: Millennium Combine 3
| 
| align=center| 2
| align=center| 5:00
| Osaka, Japan
| 
|-
| Win
| align=center| 12–7
| Jermaine Andre
| Submission (toe hold)
| Rings USA: Rising Stars Block A
| 
| align=center| 1
| align=center| 1:23
| Utah, United States
| RINGS 2000 Rising Stars Middleweight Tournament Quarterfinals
|-
| Win
| align=center| 11–7
| Matt Frost
| Submission (armbar)
| Rings USA: Rising Stars Block A
| 
| align=center| 1
| align=center| 0:30
| Utah, United States
| RINGS 2000 Rising Stars Middleweight Tournament First Round
|-
| Loss
| align=center| 10–7
| Iouri Bekichev
| KO (punch)
| Rings Russia: Russia vs. The World
| 
| align=center| 1
| align=center| 2:30
| Ekaterinburg, Russia
| 
|-
| Win
| align=center| 10–6
| Yasuhito Namekawa
| Submission (guillotine choke)
| Rings Australia: NR 4
| 
| align=center| 1
| align=center| 6:50
| Australia
| 
|-
| Win
| align=center| 9–6
| Brad Kohler
| Submission (kimura)
| Rings: King of Kings 1999 Final
| 
| align=center| 1
| align=center| 1:11
| Tokyo, Japan
| 
|-
| Loss
| align=center| 8–6
| Tsuyoshi Kohsaka
| Decision (split)
| Rings: King of Kings 1999 Block B
| 
| align=center| 3
| align=center| 5:00
| Osaka, Japan
| 
|-
| Win
| align=center| 8–5
| Willie Peeters
| Submission (kneebar)
| Rings: Rise 5th
| 
| align=center| 1
| align=center| 3:13
| Japan
| 
|-
| Win
| align=center| 7–5
| Masayuki Naruse
| Submission (kimura)
| Rings: Rise 2nd
| 
| align=center| 1
| align=center| 8:18
| Japan
| 
|-
| Win
| align=center| 6–5
| Yasuhito Namekawa
| Submission (arm triangle choke)
| Rings: Rise 1st
| 
| align=center| 1
| align=center| 7:42
| Japan
| 
|-
| Win
| align=center| 5–5
| Dick Vrij
| Submission (rear naked choke)
| Rings Australia: NR 3
| 
| align=center| 1
| align=center| 5:17
| Australia
| 
|-
| Loss
| align=center| 4–5
| Kenichi Yamamoto
| Submission
| Rings: Third Fighting Integration
| 
| align=center| 1
| align=center| 12:39
| Tokyo, Japan
| 
|-
| Loss
| align=center| 4–4
| Valentijn Overeem
| Decision (unanimous)
| Rings Holland: The King of Rings
| 
| align=center| 2
| align=center| 5:00
| Netherlands
| 
|-
| Loss
| align=center| 4–3
| Mitsuya Nagai
| Submission (heel hook)
| Rings – Mega Battle Tournament 1997 Semifinal 1
| 
| align=center| 1
| align=center| 9:18
| Japan
| 
|-
| Win
| align=center| 4–2
| Alexander Otsuka
| TKO (doctor stoppage from a cut)
| Rings – Extension Fighting 2
| 
| align=center| 1
| align=center| 7:03
| Japan
| 
|-
| Loss
| align=center| 3–2
| Mario Sperry
| TKO (submission to strikes)
| Caged Combat 1
| 
| align=center| 1
| align=center| 1:12
| Australia
| Caged Combat 1 Finals
|-
| Win
| align=center| 3–1
| Elvis Sinosic
| Submission (chin to the eye)
| Caged Combat 1
| 
| align=center| 1
| align=center| 2:47
| Australia
| Caged Combat 1 Semifinals
|-
| Win
| align=center| 2–1
| Hiriwa Te Rangi
| Submission (chin to the eye)
| Caged Combat 1: Australian Ultimate Fighting
| 
| align=center| 1
| align=center| 0:55
| Australia
| Caged Combat 1 First Round 
|-
| Loss
| align=center| 1–1
| Murilo Bustamante
| TKO (corner stoppage)
| MARS: Martial Arts Reality Superfighting
| 
| align=center| 1
| align=center| 1:01
| Alabama, United States
| 
|-
| Win
| align=center| 1–0
| Willie Peeters
| align=center| N/A
| RINGS: Budokan Hall 1996
| 
| align=center| N/A
| 
| Tokyo, Japan
|

Submission grappling record 
{| class="wikitable sortable" style="font-size:80%; text-align:left;"
|-
| colspan=8 style="text-align:center;" |  ? Matches, ? Wins, ? Losses, ? Draws
|-
!  Result
!  Rec.
!  Opponent
!  Method
!  text-center| Event
!  Date
!  Location
|-
|  Win ||align=center|2–2–0||  Luis Roberto Duarte ||  Decision · Points|| 1999 ADCC World Championships || February 24, 1999 ||  Abu Dhabi, United Arab Emirates
|-
|  Loss ||align=center|1–2–0||  Mark Kerr ||  Decision · Points|| 1999 ADCC World Championships || February 24, 1999 ||  Abu Dhabi, United Arab Emirates 
|-
|  Loss ||align=center|1–1–0||  Ricardo Morais ||  Decision · Points|| 1999 ADCC World Championships || February 24, 1999 ||  Abu Dhabi, United Arab Emirates 
|-
|  Win ||align=center|1–0–0||  Gary Myers ||  Decision · Points|| 1999 ADCC World Championships || February 24, 1999 ||  Abu Dhabi, United Arab Emirates 
|-

References

External links

 

1969 births
Australian male mixed martial artists
Australian jujutsuka
Light heavyweight mixed martial artists
Mixed martial artists utilizing wrestling
Mixed martial artists utilizing jujutsu
Mixed martial artists utilizing karate
Sportspeople from Brisbane
Living people
Australian practitioners of Brazilian jiu-jitsu
Ultimate Fighting Championship male fighters
Mixed martial artists utilizing Brazilian jiu-jitsu